Buffon's river garfish (Zenarchopterus buffonis) is a species of fish in the family Hemiramphidae.

Distribution and habitat
Buffon's river garfish is found at the surface levels of rivers, estuaries and coastal waters throughout the Indo-West Pacific region, extending from southern China to northern Australia. It feeds on terrestrial insects. It grows up to 23 cm in length and is not a commercially fished species.

References

Buffon's river garfish
Freshwater fish of Australia
Buffon's river garfish